Elm Park may refer to:

Europe
Elm Park in the London Borough of Havering
Elm Park tube station, on the District Line
Elm Park (stadium), the former home of Reading Football Club 
Elm Park, a district of Dublin, Ireland
Elm Park Golf Club, a golf and tennis club at Nutley Lane, Dublin, Ireland
Elm Park, a notorious housing estate located close to the University of Limerick in Castletroy, County Limerick, Ireland
Elm Park School in Winterbourne, Gloucestershire

North America
Elm Park, Arkansas, a community in Scott County, Arkansas
Elm Park (Worcester, Massachusetts), a historic park
Elm Park and Isaac Sprague Memorial Tower in Wellesley, Massachusetts
Elm Park, Manhattan, New York, the grounds of the Apthorpe Mansion in Upper Manhattan
Elm Park, Staten Island, New York
Elm Park (Staten Island Railway station), a former railway station
Elm Park, Winnipeg, Canada

Other
Elm Park (horse) a Thoroughbred racehorse